Prince Grigol Bagration of Mukhrani (1787—1861) was a Georgian nobleman of the House of Mukhrani.

Life
Prince Grigol was son of Ioane I, Prince of Mukhrani and was born in 1787. He married Princess Mariam Tsereteli but had no children. Died on 26 February 1861.

Prince Ivane Bagration of Mukhrani was his nephew.

Major-General and participant of Russo-Turkish War (1828–29), Russo-Persian War (1826–28) and Caucasian War. Recipient of Order of St. George in 1847.

References

Акты, собранные Кавказской археографической комиссией. Т. X. Тифлис, 1885
Волков С. В. Генералитет Российской империи. Энциклопедический словарь генералов и адмиралов от Петра I до Николая II. Том I. А—К. М., 2009
Гогитидзе М. Грузинский генералитет (1699—1921). Киев, 2001
Степанов В. С., Григорович П. И. В память столетнего юбилея императорского Военного ордена Святого великомученика и Победоносца Георгия. (1769—1869). СПб., 1869
Фрейман О. Р. Пажи за 183 года (1711—1984). Биографии бывших пажей с портретами. Фридрихсгамн, 1894

1787 births
1861 deaths
House of Mukhrani
Imperial Russian Army generals
Georgian generals in the Imperial Russian Army
Georgian major generals (Imperial Russia)

Russian military personnel of the Caucasian War
People of the Russo-Persian Wars
People of the Caucasian War
Burials at the Dukhovskaya Church